Billy Mason (April 1, 1889 – January 24, 1941) was an American vaudeville performer and film comedian of the silent era. He appeared in over a hundred short films as well as several features. He also directed a handful of films, including Baseball Madness (1917) starring Gloria Swanson.

Selected filmography
 The Snare (1912)
 The Right Direction (1916)
 A Dash of Courage (1916)
 Billy the Bandit (1916)
 Baseball Madness (1917)
 Some Bride (1919)
 Hard Boiled (1919)
 A Taste of Life (1919)
 The Wolf (1919)
 It Might Happen to You (1920)

References

Bibliography
 Etulain, Richard W. Thunder in the West: The Life and Legends of Billy the Kid. University of Oklahoma Press, 2020.
 Massa, Steve. Slapstick Divas: The Women of Silent Comedy. BearManor Media, 2017.

External links

1889 births
1941 deaths
American film directors
American male film actors
Male actors from South Dakota